Silca is a cycling parts and accessories manufacturer.  They were founded in 1917 by Felice Sacchi just outside of Milan, Italy.  SILCA has been an innovator in many aspects starting by being the first company to put gauges on pumps, the first to create a high pressure frame pump, and more recently the first to have a valve controlled  inflator.  One of the newest advances from SILCA is the use of 3D Printing in Titanium.

After nearly 100 years in Milan, Claudio Sacchi, the grandson of Felice Sacchi, decided to sell the company to its current owner Josh Poertner.  Josh leaned on his extensive experience as Director of Product Development at Zipp Speed Weaponry to revive the classic brand and create long lasting products of the highest quality.

Current Operations
Since 2014 SILCA has been headquartered in Indianapolis, Indiana and producing a wide range of products.  Some of the most popular include Bicycle pumps, Multi-tool, Chain lube, saddle bags, and much more.

References

Cycle parts manufacturers

it:Silca